The 2016 Tulane Green Wave football team represented Tulane University in the 2016 NCAA Division I FBS football season. The Green Wave played their home games at Yulman Stadium in New Orleans, Louisiana, and competed in the West Division of American Athletic Conference (AAC). They were led by first-year head coach Willie Fritz. They finished the season 4–8, 1–7 in American Athletic play to finish in last place in the West Division.

Schedule
Tulane announced its 2016 football schedule on February 9, 2016. The 2016 schedule consists of 6 home and away games in the regular season. The Green Wave will host AAC foes Memphis, Navy, SMU, and Temple, and will travel to UCF, UConn, Houston, and Tulsa.

The team will play four non–conference games, two of which are home games against Louisiana–Lafayette from the Sun Belt Conference and Southern from the Southwestern Athletic Conference, and two road game against Massachusetts (UMass) and travel to Wake Forest from the Atlantic Coast Conference.

The game between Tulane and UCF on October 7, 2016, was postponed due to Hurricane Matthew.  The game was rescheduled for the following month on November 5, 2016, with the kickoff time to be announced.
Schedule Source:

Game summaries

Wake Forest

Southern

Navy

Louisiana–Lafayette

Massachusetts

Memphis

Tulsa

SMU

UCF

The game, originally scheduled for a 7:30 pm kickoff on October 6 to be televised on ESPNU, was moved to November 5 due to Hurricane Matthew. The game was moved to November 5 because both teams, coincidentally, had scheduled bye weeks for that week.

Houston

Temple

UConn

References

Tulane
Tulane Green Wave football seasons
Tulane Green Wave football